Dora Township may refer to the following townships in the United States:

 Dora Township, Moultrie County, Illinois
 Dora Township, Otter Tail County, Minnesota